Cozaddale is an unincorporated community in southeastern Hamilton Township, Warren County, Ohio, United States. It is two miles west of Pleasant Plain, and three miles north of Goshen, Ohio.

History
Cozaddale was platted by John J. Cozad in 1871, and named for him. A post office was established at Cozaddale in 1871, and remained in operation until 1968.  Cozad also founded the city of Cozad, Nebraska.

Notable people
Clem Bevans was born in 1879 in Cozaddale. He had a long and prolific film and stage career and often played older men in supporting roles.
Ches Crist was born in 1882 in Cozaddale. He was the only Cozaddale-born native to date to play professional baseball. He played for the 1906 Philadelphia Phillies, appearing in six games as a catcher.
George Terwilleger was born in Cozaddale in 1941, and served as Warren County Commissioner and as Ohio state representative. A bridge in Foster, Ohio, where the Old 3-C Highway crosses the Little Miami River, is named in his honor.
Robert Henri ( Robert Henry Cozad), son of John J. Cozad, lived in Cozaddale as a boy. He was a prolific portrait artist and teacher. Leader of the Immortal Eight and the Ashcan School.

References

Unincorporated communities in Warren County, Ohio
Unincorporated communities in Ohio
Populated places established in 1871
1871 establishments in Ohio